Giuseppe "Pippo" Rinaldi, known as Kaballà (born in Caltagirone (Italy), 7 July 1953), is an Italian musician and singer/songwriter.

Biography 
The Sicilian composer Pippo Rinaldi, stage name Kaballà, has been living and working in Milan for many years. His distance from Sicily brings him to find  “A lava stone bridge” which brings him back to memorable places.

LPs as singer/songwriter 
 Petra Lavica (CGD 1991), is a fusion of work between popular music, rock and world music
 Le Vie Dei Canti (Polydor 1993)
 Lettere Dal Fondo Del Mare (Polydor 1996), is in the style of singer/songwriter mixed with electric sound American rock.
 Astratti Furori - live (Musica & Suoni 1998) is an anthology of his best songs, reproduced in an unplugged version and recorded during a live tour.

Career as a songwriter 
In 1990 he writes to Nino Rota’s music in Sicilian words, “Famous serenade” sung in the film “The Godfather - Part III” by Francis Ford Coppola.

In 1991 he was a finalist at “Premio Tenco”

In 1992 he was a guest at Recanati’s “Musicultura”.

In 1996 he wrote the soundtrack to the Italo-Russian film “La Delegazione” by Alexander Galin.

In 1997 he composed the soundtrack to the short film “Amati Matti” directed by Daniele Pignatelli, which participated in the 54th International Exhibition of Cinematography Art, in Venice.

In 1999 he wrote the song "Non Ti Dimentico (Se non ci fossero le nuvole)" sung by Antonella Ruggiero at the Sanremo Festival.

In 2000 he was the songwriter of all the unreleased songs in the musical “Eppy, The man who created the myth of the Beatles. ”

In 2003 he adapted all the songs from the musical “Fame” to Italian.

In 2004 he wrote the song "Crudele",  sung by Mario Venuti, winning the critique prize at the Sanremo Festival

In 2005:
 He collaborated with Eros Ramazzotti, on the LP “Calma Apparente” and on the unreleased songs on the double LP “E2” featuring the duets with Anastacia and Ricky Martin.
 He collaborated with Mario Venuti, and they write four LPs
 He wrote  "Echi d’infinito" sung by Antonella Ruggiero, winning the first position in the female singer category at the Sanremo Festival
In 2006 he wrote "Un altro posto nel mondo", sung by Mario Venuti at the Sanremo Festival.

In 2008 he helped write some songs on Plácido Domingo’s album “Amore Infinito”, an ambitious project launched from the idea to convert Pope John Paul II’s poems and writings into songs. "La Tua Semplicità" a duet with the American tenor Josh Groban is one of the songs on this album together with "Canto del Sole Inesauribile", a song Plácido Domingosings in a duet with Andrea Bocelli.

In 2008 he wrote  "A Ferro e Fuoco" (2008) sung by Mario Venuti at the Sanremo Festival

In 2010 he wrote for Nina Zilli "L'uomo che Amava le Donne", winning the critique prize at the Sanremo Festival.

In 2013 he collaborated with Mario Incudine, a singer and musician at world music, in the production of LP "Italia,  Talia ".

In 2015 he and Mario Incudine sign the Sicilian translation of “Supplici di Eschilo” in the Greek Theater of Syracuse. Directed by Moni Ovadia and Mario Incudine. Original music by Mario Incudine.

In 2017 he wrote 
 “Le Canzoni Fanno Male" sung by Marianne Mirage at the Sanremo Festival. 
 "Caduto dalle stelle" sung by Mario Venuti

In 2018 he wrote 
 "Il futuro si è perso" sung by Umberto Alongi

Tenor pop music 
He worked on the international “tenor pop” record industry and Italian productions simultaneously, writing:
 an unreleased Italian song composed and produced by David Foster and interpreted by young American tenor Josh Groban, 
 an Italian version of  "Angels" by Robbie Williams, sung by young Austrian baritone singer Patrizio Buanne and an Italian version of "I Will Always Love You" by Dolly Parton interpreted by Welsh soprano singer Katherine Jenkins. 
 the Italian adaptations of many successful international hits (from Elton John to R.E.M.) interpreted by English tenor Tony Henry accompanied by The Royal Philharmonic Orchestra. 
 some compositions for ZAZ and the young tenor Vincent Niclò.

Artists for which he has written songs 
Anna Oxa, Mietta, Antonella Ruggiero, Musica Nuda, Nicky Nicolai, Susanna Parigi, Patrizia Laquidara, Carmen Consoli, Paola Turci, Raf, Ron, Alex Britti, Tazenda, Noemi, Alessandra Amoroso, Valerio Scanu and the winners of the first three editions of X Factor Aram Quartet, Matteo Becucci e Marco Mengoni are amongst the many artists that Kaballà has worked with throughout the years.

Discography as singer 
 Petra lavica (1991) - CGD Warner
 Le vie dei canti (1993) - Polydor
 Lettere dal fondo del mare (1996) - Polydor
 Astratti furori [live] (1998) - Musica & Suoni

References 

Year of birth missing (living people)
Living people
Italian songwriters
People from Caltagirone
Musicians from Milan
Musicians from the Province of Catania

es:Kaballà#top